Pymatuning Valley High School is a public high school in Andover, Ohio, Ashtabula County, Ohio . it is the only high school in the district. Their mascot is the Lakers and compete as a member of the Ohio High School Athletic Association and is a member of the Northeastern Athletic Conference.

Athletics 
Pymatuning Valley currently offers:

 Baseball
 Basketball
 Cheerleading
 Cross Country
 Football
 Soccer
 Softball
 Swimming
 Track and Field
 Volleyball
 Wrestling

Extracurricular Activities 
5 AP Courses (English Literature, English Language, American Government, American History, and Calculus), Dual-Credit Chemistry and Physics with Eastern Gateway Community College, FFA program, Student council, Class Officers, Botany team, Tennis team, academic challenge team, band, jazz band, Show Choir, choir, Ashtabula County Youth Leadership, and the Ashtabula County Mentorship Program.

References

External links
 District Website
 Ashtabula County Technical and Career Campus (A-Tech)

High schools in Ashtabula County, Ohio
Public high schools in Ohio